The United National Convention (UNC) was a centrist political party in Ghana during the Third Republic (1979–1981). 

In the elections held on 18 June 1979 UNC presidential candidate William Ofori Atta won 17.4% of the vote and the party won 13 of 140 seats in the National Assembly.

References

Defunct political parties in Ghana
Political parties established in 1979
1979 in Ghana